Nazira Jumblatt (18901951) was a Druze leader and the mother of Lebanese politician and Kamal Jumblatt. She was styled sitt (lady in Arabic).

Biography

Nazira was born in 1890, and her parents were Faris and Afrida Said Jumblatt. She was educated at home by her grandmother and private teachers and learned both English and French.

She married Fouad Jumblatt in 1905 when she was 15. Their children were Kamal Jumblatt and Linda Al Atrash who was killed in her house in East Beirut 27 May May 1976 during the civil war. Nazira took on the political role and the leadership of the Jumblatt family upon the assassination of her husband Fouad Jumblatt in 1921. She ran the family affairs until 1943 when her son Kamal took the reins of political and family leadership into his own hands. Unlike her son, she was close to the French authorities.

Following the assassination of Fouad Jumblatt, the Jumblatt family groups, the Mukhtara and the Biramiya groups, had internal conflicts. The former was led by Nazira, and the latter by Ali Jumblatt and his son Hikmat who challenged the leadership of Nazira. Nazira managed to end this struggle in 1937 when her daughter Linda married Hikmat. Through Nazira's attempts the Druze rebellion in Hauran occurred between 1925 and 1927 did not expand to other regions. Nazira died on 27 March 1951.

Legacy
French novelist Pierre Benoit used Al-Sitt Nazira as the model for the heroine of his 1924 novel La Châtelaine du Liban (the Châtelaine of Lebanon). Sitt Nazira was also the main subject of the 2003 Lebanese documentary Lady of the Palace.

References

1890 births
1951 deaths
Nazira
People from Chouf District
Lebanese Druze
20th-century Lebanese politicians
20th-century Lebanese women